HMS Albion was a 90-gun second-rate ship of the line of the Royal Navy. Ordered in 1839, she was built at Plymouth Dockyard, launched on 6 September 1842, and completed on 23 January 1844. Albion was designed by Sir William Symonds, was the only ship of her class to ever serve as a sailing ship, and the last British two-decker to be completed and enter service without a steam engine.

Career
Albion entered service in 1844 and was deployed to the Black Sea during the Crimean War. Her crew suffered many casualties from Cholera in August 1854. She took part in the siege of Sevastopol, with her commanding officer, Captain Stephen Lushington taking charge of a Naval Brigade providing vital heavy artillery support for the Allied forces besieging Sevastopol. On 17 October 1854, Albion, under the command of Commander Henry Rogers joined over 50 British and French warships of various types in an initial seaborne bombardment of Sevastapol. The Russians suffered heavy casualties (at least 1,100 men) but the Allies had failed to seriously damage the batteries. The Anglo-French fleet had received comparatively light casualties, with about 500 killed or wounded in total. However, the Allies had taken a beating from the Russian batteries, and Albion had been set on fire three times during the engagement, with 11 killed and 71 injured. Without the assistance of tugs, it is probable that Albion would have run aground. On 17 August 1855 Albion took part in the fifth bombardment of Sevastopol.

Fate
From 1860 until 1861, she was converted to steam screw propulsion at Devonport, but the modifications were never finished. She was kept in reserve in Devonport for more than twenty years, before the decision was made to scrap her, and she was finally broken up at Devonport in 1884.

Notes

References

 
 Lavery, Brian (2003) The Ship of the Line - Volume 1: The development of the battlefleet 1650–1850. Conway Maritime Press. .

External links
 

Ships of the line of the Royal Navy
Albion-class ships of the line (1842)
Victorian-era ships of the line of the United Kingdom
Ships built in Plymouth, Devon
1842 ships